The 2020 World TeamTennis season was the 45th season of the top professional team tennis league in the United States.

Due to the impact of the COVID-19 pandemic, all matches are held at The Greenbrier “America’s Resort” in White Sulphur Springs, West Virginia.

The New York Empire won their first King Trophy as WTT champions with a 21–20 win in a Supertiebreaker over the Chicago Smash in the WTT Finals.

Competition format
The 2020 World TeamTennis season includes nine teams. Each team plays a 14-match regular-season schedule.
The matches consist of five sets, with one set each of men's and women's singles, men's and women's doubles, and mixed doubles. The first team to reach five games wins each set. A nine-point tiebreaker is played if a set reaches four games all. One point is awarded for each game won and scoring is cumulative. If necessary, Extended Play and a Supertiebreaker are played to determine the winner of the match.
The top four teams in the regular season (12–30 July) will qualify for the World TeamTennis playoffs. The winner of the WTT Finals will be awarded the King Trophy.

Teams and players
The roster players compete for the entire season.

Standings
The top four teams qualified for the 2020 WTT Semifinals.

Results table
Color Key: Win  Loss - Reference:

Statistics
The tables below show the WTT players and teams with the highest regular-season winning percentages in each of the league's five events.

Players

Note: Only players who played in at least 40% of their team's total number of games in a particular event are considered. (Overall at least 30% of team's total games)

Most Valuable Players 
Male MVP: Taylor Fritz (Philadelphia Freedoms) 
Female MVP: Bethanie Mattek-Sands (Chicago Smash)

Teams

Playoffs

Bracket

Semifinals

Finals

Finals MVP: CoCo Vandeweghe

See also

 Team tennis

References

External links
 Official website

World TeamTennis seasons
World TeamTennis season
2020 in sports in West Virginia
The Greenbrier